The Star-class destroyer was a class of eight destroyers that served in the Royal Navy: , , , , , ,  and , were all three-funnelled C-class destroyers, as designated in the reorganisation of classes in 1913. Chamois foundered in 1904; the other ships served during the Great War and were broken up in 1919.  

They were built by Palmer's Shipbuilding Company, were 215 feet long and displaced 360 tons.  Their Reed boilers produced  which gave them .  They were armed, as was standard, with one 12-pounder gun and two torpedo tubes.  They carried a complement of 63 officers and men.  The boats had funnel caps and the steam pipes of the middle funnel were not in the centre line.  They served in the Mediterranean and home waters.

References

External links 
 

Destroyer classes
Ship classes of the Royal Navy